Twin Forks may refer to:

 Twin Forks, New Mexico
 Twin Forks (band), an American folk rock band
 Twin Forks (album)
 Twin Forks (EP)